Bruno Dadillon (born 9 February 1964) is a French former professional tennis player.

Born in Manosque, Dadillon was a left-handed player who competed on the professional tour in the 1980s. 

His best performances on the Grand Prix circuit were second round appearances at the 1985 Bordeaux Open and the 1986 Athens Open. He also featured as a wildcard in the main draw of the 1986 French Open, where he was beaten in the first round by José López-Maeso.

Dadillon was the coach of French tennis players Fabrice Santoro and Virginie Razzano.

References

External links
 
 

1964 births
Living people
French male tennis players
People from Manosque
Sportspeople from Alpes-de-Haute-Provence